The 177th (Simcoe Foresters) Battalion, CEF was a unit in the Canadian Expeditionary Force raised during the First World War by the 35th Simcoe Foresters.  Based in Barrie, Ontario and later at Camp Borden, the unit began recruiting during the winter of 1915/16 in Simcoe County, Ontario.  The battalion arrived at Camp Borden on 3 July 1916 where it trained until sailing to England in May 1917. The battalion was absorbed into the 3rd Reserve Battalion on May 14, 1917.  The 177th (Simcoe Foresters) Battalion, CEF had one Officer Commanding: Lieut-Col. J. B. McPhee, and is perpetuated by The Grey and Simcoe Foresters.

References
Meek, John F. Over the Top! The Canadian Infantry in the First World War. Orangeville, Ont.: The Author, 1971.
Chajkowsky, William E. "The History of Camp Borden, 1916-1918, Land of Sand, Sin and Sorrow." Vineland: Station Press, 1983.
Fisher, Major J.R. and Captain E.J. Fuller. "The Grey and Simcoe Foresters, A Concise Regimental History." Barrie: The Grey and Simcoe Foresters, 2008 
Frost, Honourable Leslie. "Fighting Men" Toronto: Clarke, Irwin, 1967
Rutherford, Brigadier Tom, ed. "An Unofficial History of The Grey and Simcoe Foresters Regiment 1866 to 1973." Owen Sound: The Grey and Simcoe Foresters, 1973
Telford, Major Murray M. "Scarlet to Green, the colours, uniforms and insignia of The Grey and Simcoe Foresters." Erin: The Boston Mills Press, 1987 

Battalions of the Canadian Expeditionary Force
Organizations based in Barrie